is an English trusts law case, concerning the duty of care owed by a trustee when exercising the power of investment.

Facts
Elizabeth Whiteley and her children sued the executors of Benjamin Whiteley's will (of 19 March 1874). The will contained a power to invest the fund on certain investments, including “real securities in England or Wales.” £5000 of the trust money had been lost. £3000 was invested in a mortgage at 5% return in the freehold of a ten-acre brick field near Pontefract, “with the engine-house, sheds, brick and pipe kilns, and buildings thereon, and all fixtures and fittings thereon.” £2000 was invested on mortgages at 5% in four small freehold houses, including a shop, in Salford, Lancashire. The brickfield owners went bankrupt in October 1884 and the owner of the four houses filed for petition for liquidation. There was insufficient money to pay the trust fund.

Judgments

Chancery Court
Bacon VC held in the Chancery Court that the brickfield investment was unauthorised, and the trustees were responsible for its failure. The trustees failed to exercise sufficient caution, but they had done so in the case of the houses. The trustees appealed.

Court of Appeal
The Court of Appeal upheld Bacon VC's decision, that the trustees were liable for repayment of the £3000 invested in the brickfield. They held that a trustee must exercise the standard of care of an ordinary prudent businessman, applying any special knowledge he may have. Cotton LJ stated,

Lindley LJ followed.

Lopes LJ concurred.

House of Lords
Lord Halsbury LC affirmed the Court of Appeal. Lord Watson held that in administering and managing trust property (distinguished from the investment sphere),

Lord Fitzgerald concurred.

See also

UK company law, Companies Act 2006, s 174
Speight v Gaunt (1882) 22 Ch D 727, 739, Sir George Jessel MR, 'It seems to me that on general principles a trustee ought to conduct the business of the trust in the same manner that an ordinary prudent man of business would conduct his own, and that beyond that there is no liability or obligation on the trustee.'
Belchier v Parsons (1754) 96 ER 908

Notes

English trusts case law
Lord Lindley cases
House of Lords cases
1886 in case law
1886 in British law